Dirk Zander (born 13 May 1965) is a German retired professional footballer who played as a midfielder.

References

1965 births
Living people
German footballers
Footballers from Hamburg
Association football midfielders
Bundesliga players
2. Bundesliga players
FC St. Pauli players
Dynamo Dresden players